Pseudooctadecabacter is a genus of bacteria from the family of Rhodobacteraceae with one known species (Pseudooctadecabacter jejudonensis).

References

Rhodobacteraceae
Bacteria genera
Monotypic bacteria genera